Pottawatomie County (standard abbreviation: PT) is a county located in the U.S. state of Kansas. As of the 2020 census, the county population was 25,348. The county seat is Westmoreland. The county takes its name from the Potawatomi tribe of Native Americans.

History

Early history

For millennia, the Great Plains of North America were inhabited by nomadic Native Americans.  From the 16th to 18th centuries, the Kingdom of France claimed ownership of large parts of North America.  In 1762, after the French and Indian War, France secretly ceded New France to Spain, by the Treaty of Fontainebleau.

19th century
In 1802, Spain returned most of the land to France, keeping title to about 7,500 square miles. In 1803, most of the land for modern day Kansas was acquired by the United States from France as part of the 828,000 square mile Louisiana Purchase.

In 1854, the Kansas Territory was organized under the provisions of the Kansas–Nebraska Act, then in 1861 Kansas became the 34th U.S. state.

In 1857, Pottawatomie County was established by the Kansas Territorial legislature, out of land formerly included in Riley County. The present county seat of Westmoreland was selected by a vote held in 1882.

Geography

Adjacent counties
 Marshall County (north)
 Nemaha County (northeast)
 Jackson County (east)
 Shawnee County (southeast)
 Wabaunsee County (south)
 Riley County (west)

Demographics

Pottawatomie County is part of the Manhattan Metropolitan Statistical Area.

As of the census of 2000, there were 18,209 people, 6,771 households, and 4,929 families residing in the county.  The population density was 22 people per square mile (8/km2).  There were 7,311 housing units at an average density of 9 per square mile (3/km2).  The racial makeup of the county was 96.32% White, 0.66% Black or African American, 0.59% Native American, 0.32% Asian, 0.01% Pacific Islander, 0.60% from other races, and 1.50% from two or more races.  2.26% of the population were Hispanic or Latino of any race.

There were 6,771 households, out of which 36.40% had children under the age of 18 living with them, 62.40% were married couples living together, 7.20% had a female householder with no husband present, and 27.20% were non-families. 23.20% of all households were made up of individuals, and 9.70% had someone living alone who was 65 years of age or older.  The average household size was 2.65 and the average family size was 3.15.

In the county, the population was spread out, with 29.50% under the age of 18, 7.70% from 18 to 24, 27.70% from 25 to 44, 21.60% from 45 to 64, and 13.50% who were 65 years of age or older.  The median age was 36 years. For every 100 females, there were 98.00 males.  For every 100 females age 18 and over, there were 96.70 males.

The median income for a household in the county was $40,176, and the median income for a family was $47,261. Males had a median income of $31,368 versus $23,238 for females. The per capita income for the county was $17,785.  About 6.40% of families and 9.70% of the population were below the poverty line, including 14.10% of those under age 18 and 10.30% of those age 65 or over.

Government

Presidential elections

Typical of rural Kansas, Pottawatomie County is mostly Republican. The only Democratic presidential candidate to gain a majority in Pottawatomie County has been Franklin D. Roosevelt in 1932, while since 1940 only Lyndon Johnson in 1964 has received so much as forty percent of the county's vote.

Laws
Pottawatomie County was a prohibition, or "dry", county until the Kansas Constitution was amended in 1986 and voters approved the sale of alcoholic liquor by the individual drink with a 30% food sales requirement.

Education

Unified school districts
The Unified School Districts that serve Pottawatomie County include:
 Wamego USD 320
 Kaw Valley USD 321
 Onaga USD 322
 Rock Creek USD 323

School district office in neighboring county
 Riley County USD 378
 Manhattan–Ogden USD 383
 Blue Valley USD 384

Private schools
 St. Marys Academy & College (St. Marys)
 Flint Hills Christian School (Manhattan)

Communities

Cities

 Belvue

 Emmett
 Havensville
 Louisville
 Manhattan, mainly in Riley County
 Olsburg
 Onaga
 St. George
 St. Marys
 Wamego
 Westmoreland (county seat) 
 Wheaton

Prior to the creation of Tuttle Creek Lake, the town of Garrison existed in west central Pottawatomie County.

Townships
Pottawatomie County is divided into twenty-three townships.  The city of Manhattan is considered governmentally independent and is excluded from the census figures for the townships.  In the following table, the population center is the largest city (or cities) included in that township's population total, if it is of a significant size.

See also
 National Register of Historic Places listings in Pottawatomie County, Kansas

References

Notes

Further reading

 Handbook of Pottawatomie and Riley Counties, Kansas; Modern Ago; 20 pages; 1880s.
 Standard Atlas of Pottawatomie County, Kansas; Geo. A. Ogle & Co; 57 pages; 1905.
 Onaga Courier's Township Map of Pottawatomie County, Kansas; Onaga Courier; 59 pages; 1899.

External links

County
 
 Pottawatomie County - Directory of Public Officials
 Pottawatomie County Economic Development Corporation - PCEDC
Maps
 Pottawatomie County Maps: Current, Historic, KDOT
 Kansas Highway Maps: Current, Historic, KDOT
 Kansas Railroad Maps: Current, 1996, 1915, KDOT and Kansas Historical Society

 
Kansas counties
Kansas placenames of Native American origin
1857 establishments in Kansas Territory
Manhattan, Kansas metropolitan area
Populated places established in 1857